Maciej Orłowski (born 7 January 1994) is a Polish professional footballer who plays as a right-back for Radunia Stężyca.

Career

Club career

Orlowski started his career with Lech Poznań.

On 5 February 2019, Orłowski was loaned out to Górnik Łęczna for the rest of 2019. Górnik Łęczna decided to sign him permanently on 16 January 2020.

References

External links

1994 births
Living people
Polish footballers
Association football defenders
Lech Poznań II players
Lech Poznań players
Górnik Łęczna players
Ekstraklasa players
I liga players
II liga players
III liga players